Gancia  is an Italian surname. Notable people with the name include:

 Carlo Gancia (wine), founder of the Gancia wine-producing company
 Carlo Vallarino Gancia, an Italo-Brazilian businessman
 Gianna Gancia, an Italian politician

See also 
 Gancia
 Gancia (disambiguation)